Edward Hannan may refer to:

 Edward J. Hannan (1921–1994), Australian statistician
 Edward Joseph Hannan (1836–1891), Irish-born priest, founder of Hibernian Football Club in Edinburgh